Cher Strauberry (born 1992) is a goofy-footed American skateboarder and musician.

Skateboarding 
At age 12, Strauberry took first place overall in the California Amateur Skateboard League. Although experiencing early success as a skateboarder, Strauberry quit skateboarding for a number of years after a series of ankle injuries. On January 1, 2017 Leo Baker (skateboarder) came to a show Strauberry was playing. Leo told Cher they were a fan of her band. This inspired Strauberry to start skating again.

In 2019, All Hail the Black Market released a Cher Strauberry signature skateboard.

Strauberry does a backside 180 heelflip at Embarcadero, in the 2019 Supreme video CANDYLAND directed by William Strobeck. Strauberry's clip is followed by Beatrice Domond.

Skate video parts 
SMUT - Glue Skateboards - 2020
CANDYLAND - William Strobeck - Supreme - 2019
SWMRS - video -  "Trashbag Baby" - 2019
Strauberry Peach - SKATEISM - with Peach Sørensen - 2018

Music 
At age 16, Strauberry discovered 924 Gilman Street in Berkeley, an all-inclusive and all-ages collective music venue. At the venue, she saw Younger Lovers, floating corpses and became a regular at east bay punk shows

Twompsax 
Twompsax is Strauberry's current project.

Transitioning 
On March 5, 2018, Strauberry announced to her Instagram followers that she was transitioning.

References

External links
 Queer-Centric Skateboarding: The Story of Glue Skateboards - Thrasher magazine

American skateboarders
Living people
LGBT skateboarders
American LGBT singers
Artist skateboarders
1992 births
21st-century American LGBT people